Enrique David Díaz Velázquez (born 4 September 1982 in Salto), commonly known as Enrique Díaz, is a Uruguayan footballer who plays as a centre back for Independiente Petrolero in the Liga de Fútbol Profesional Boliviano.

External links
 Profile at soccerway
 ESPN profile
 BDFA profile

1982 births
Living people
Footballers from Salto, Uruguay
Uruguayan footballers
Uruguayan expatriate footballers
Association football defenders
Atlético Mexiquense footballers
Kitchee SC players
Club Blooming players
Club San José players
C.D. Jorge Wilstermann players
Expatriate footballers in Bolivia
Expatriate footballers in Venezuela
Expatriate footballers in Hong Kong
Uruguayan expatriate sportspeople in Bolivia
Uruguayan expatriate sportspeople in Venezuela
Uruguayan expatriate sportspeople in Hong Kong
Hong Kong League XI representative players